Norman Dunn may refer to:

 Norman Alexander Dunn (born 1967), Jamaican politician
 Norman Dunn (EastEnders character)